Bossiaea halophila is a species of flowering plant in the family Fabaceae and is endemic to Western Australia. It is a dense, erect, many-branched shrub with narrow-winged cladodes, leaves reduced to small scales, and yellow-orange and deep red flowers.

Description

Taxonomy and naming
Bossiaea halophila was first formally described in 1998 by James Henderson Ross in the journal Muelleria from specimens collected the start of the causeway on the western side of Lake King in 1996. The specific epithet (halophila) means "salt-loving", referring to the preferred habitat of this species.

Distribution and habitat
This bossiaea grows in deep sand around the edge of salt lakes, often with mallee eucalypts and sometimes with Bossiaea cucullata. It occurs from near Pingaring to Hyden and Pingrup with an outlier near Lake King, in the Avon Wheatbelt and Mallee biogeographic regions of south-western Western Australia.

Conservation status
Bossiaea halophila is classified as "not threatened" by the Government of Western Australia Department of Parks and Wildlife.

References

halophila
Mirbelioids
Flora of Western Australia
Plants described in 1998